Rock 'n' Roll Adventures is a platform video game developed and published by Data Design Interactive and Conspiracy Entertainment. The game was released in Europe on Microsoft Windows, PlayStation 2, and Wii on 17 September 2007 and in North America on 11 October 2007. Its gameplay and mechanics are almost identical to a vast array of other titles by the same company (most notably Ninjabread Man), and, as it has been considered shovelware, it received very negative reviews from critics.

Gameplay
Like Ninjabread Man, there are 3 levels, plus a tutorial. In the tutorial level, the game will show the player what controls to use. For the rest of the levels, the player must collect all 8 Power Rods. The enemies of the game are drum parts like cymbals.

The game uses the Wii Remote and Nunchuk. Jerking the Nunchuk up allows the player to jump. Swinging the Wii Remote swings the player's guitar.

Reception
The game has received poor reception. IGN gave the game a 3.0/10, criticizing it for non-interesting graphics, sloppy gameplay, and bad controls. Official Nintendo Magazine pointed out that the spine of the box misspells the title as "Rock n' Roll Adevntures".

References

2007 video games
Cultural depictions of Elvis Presley
Data Design Interactive games
Music video games
PlayStation 2 games
Video games developed in the United Kingdom
Wii games
Windows games
3D platform games

Single-player video games
Video games using Havok
RenderWare games
Conspiracy Entertainment games